In mathematics, a uniqueness theorem, also called a unicity theorem, is a theorem asserting the uniqueness of an object satisfying certain conditions, or the equivalence of all objects satisfying the said conditions. Examples of uniqueness theorems include:

 Alexandrov's uniqueness theorem of three-dimensional polyhedra
 Black hole uniqueness theorem
 Cauchy–Kowalevski theorem is the main local existence and uniqueness theorem for analytic partial differential equations associated with Cauchy initial value problems.
 Cauchy–Kowalevski–Kashiwara theorem is a wide generalization of the Cauchy–Kowalevski theorem for systems of linear partial differential equations with analytic coefficients.
Division theorem, the uniqueness of quotient and remainder under Euclidean division.
 Fundamental theorem of arithmetic, the uniqueness of prime factorization.
 Holmgren's uniqueness theorem for linear partial differential equations with real analytic coefficients.
 Picard–Lindelöf theorem, the uniqueness of solutions to first-order differential equations.
 Thompson uniqueness theorem in finite group theory
 Uniqueness theorem for Poisson's equation
 Electromagnetism uniqueness theorem for the solution of Maxwell's equation
 Uniqueness case in finite group theory

The word unique is sometimes replaced by essentially unique, whenever one wants to stress that the uniqueness is only referred to the underlying structure, whereas the form may vary in all ways that do not affect the mathematical content.

A uniqueness theorem (or its proof) is, at least within the mathematics of differential equations, often combined with an existence theorem (or its proof) to a combined existence and uniqueness theorem (e.g., existence and uniqueness of solution to first-order differential equations with boundary condition).

See also
Existence theorem
Rigidity (mathematics)
 Uniqueness quantification

References 

 
Mathematical terminology